Brett Jones is an American singer, songwriter, and music publisher from Warm Springs, Georgia, United States, working in country music. He has had over one hundred songs recorded, including fourteen top ten hits and five number one hits.

Jones signed a publishing deal with a company owned by country music singer Ronnie Milsap. His first top twenty hit came in 1995 with Confederate Railroad’s “When and Where.” He owns Crazytown Productions/Big Borassa Music, in which he looks over many of his own catalogs such as Big Borassa Music, Jonesbone Music, and Brett Jones Music. As of 2012, his catalogs and himself as an artist were signed to ole, a rights management company. Jones, as an artist, also released his own CD called Life’s Road  in 2009 and followed with Cowboy Sailor in July 2014.

Singles 
Singles that Jones has co-written include:

References

American country songwriters
American male songwriters
Year of birth missing (living people)
Living people
People from Meriwether County, Georgia
Songwriters from Georgia (U.S. state)